Alandroal is a municipality in the Portuguese district of Évora located on the eastern frontier with Spain along the right margin of the Guadiana River in the Central Alentejo region. The population in 2011 was 5,843, in an area of 542.68 km².

History
 
With the completion of the castle in 1298, by Lourenço Afonso (9th Master of the Order of Aviz), the noble fulfilled his obligation to King Denis of Portugal to expand the territory that would form Alandroal. By 1359, the church of Alandroal was incorporated under the commander of the Order of Avis, but it was only a century later (1486) that John II would issue a foral (charter) for the town. Alandroal was elevated to town at this time, while only including the parish of Nossa Senhora da Conceição. A second foral was conceded in 1514 by his successor, Manuel I of Portugal.

Alandroal's historic importance include the medieval structures during the early period of Christian conquest, including the Castle of Alandroal (whose main gate was flanked by two towers); the Castle of Terena, consisting of wall-enclosed courtyard, keep and towers; the fortress of Juromenha, whose balusters were constructed later during the Portuguese Restoration War, but whose proximity to the Guadiana frontier provided a natural buttress to Castilian influence in the region.

The lands at the time, flowered with Nerium oleander shrubs and trees, whose wood was used by local artisans.

The sanctuary of Nossa Senhora da Assunção da Boa Nova, apart from its religious importance, is of national importance. In 1340, the Moors had invaded from Andaluzia, resulting in an alliance between Alfonso XI of Castile and his father-in-law, Afonso IV of Portugal, that culminated in the Battle of Río Salado. In honor of their assistance during the Marinid invasion, Maria of Portugal, Queen of Castile ordered the construction of the Gothic church to commemorate their victory.

In the 16th century the old Gothic church was substituted but the current parochial church in Alandroal. At the same time, the hermitage of Nossa Senhora das Neves, in the older lands of Mata, then known as Nossa Senhora das Hervas, received annual festivals on 5 August. Similarly, the brotherhood of the Misercórdia was probably established this century, constructing the primitive temple for those religious services.

On 14 January 1659, a gunpowder warehouse exploded, causing the deaths of various residents, but primarily university students from Évora (under the authority of Father Francisco Soares), who were dispatched to Alandroal while the main Portuguese army fought in the Battle of the Lines of Elvas.

The effects of the 1755 Lisbon earthquake resulted in destruction of various buildings.

By the second half of the 18th century, a decision of the Council of State to King Joseph I permitted the construction of a new municipal building for Alandroal, for which were acquired furniture from local and awnings for the market.

During the 19th Century territories of the older municipalities of Terena and Juromenha where annexed to Alandroal. The community of Villarreal, situated in the municipality of Olivença was once a part of the antique administration of Juromenha.

Geography

The municipality is delimited in the north by Vila Viçosa, east by the Guadiana River and Spanish border, south by Mourão and Reguengos de Monsaraz, and west by the municipality of Redondo. Alandroal is one of three towns defined within the municipality of the same name, and includes the vilas of Terena and Juromenha.

The morphology of Alandroal is marked by a gently rolling relief with a minimum of  altitude, with exceptions to this including Patinhas,  and Castelo mountain . The Alqueva Dam, along the Guadiana River, is located in this territory, with major confluences including the Ribeira de Alcalate and Ribeira do Alandroal just the principal water resources.

The climate of Alandroal is a markedly Mediterranean temperament, characterized by a dry climate that is accentuated in the summer.

Parishes
The municipality is subdivided into four civil parishes:
 Alandroal (Nossa Senhora da Conceição), São Brás dos Matos (Mina do Bugalho) e Juromenha (Nossa Senhora do Loreto)
 Capelins (Santo António)
 Santiago Maior
 Terena (São Pedro)

The city of Alandroal is one of three towns in the municipality, along with Terena and Juromenha.

Economy
The municipality's economic activities are connected to the primary and secondary sectors primarily. Agriculture continues to be important, with the cultivation of cereals, foraging and industrial plants, such as olive orchards dominating the rural landscape. The raising of livestock, namely poultry, swine and cattle, also draws on local resources, while 36.3% (or 1711 hectares) of the territory is covered in forests, allowing a nascent saw-milling and carpentry industry.

Architecture

Prehistoric
 Castro of Castelo Velho, a fortified settlement situated over the Rio Lucefecit associated with metallurgical activities during the Chalolithic era, that includes several structures and short wall. The site had human settlement since the Bronze Age until the Moorish occupation, but little information on events leading to its abandon.
 Fortified settlement/sanctuary of Endovelicus

Civic

 Farmers Guild of Alandroal
 Fountain of Praça
 Great Mill of São Brás dos Matos
 Mill of Azenhas d'el Rei
 Municipal Hall of Alandroal
 Municipal Hall of Terena
 Old Bridge of Terena (over the Ribeira de Lucefécit)
 Pillory of Alandroal
 Pillory of Juromenha
 Pillory of Terena
 Spring of the Misericórdia

Military

 Castle of Alandroal, is a castle constructed during the reign of King D. Denis, dated 6 February 1294; its cornerstone was laid-down by Lourenço Afonso, 9th Master of the Order of Avis;
 Castle of Terena, Gil Martins and his wife, D. Maria João were responsible for its founding in 1262, to support the interests of King D. Denis to consolidate his kingdom's frontiers;
 Fortress of Juromenha

Religious

 Chapel of Santo António
 Chapel of São Sebastião
 Church of Nossa Senhora da Conceição
 Church of Nossa Senhora do Loreto
 Church of Santo António
 Church of São Brás
 Church of São Francisco de Assissi
 Church of São Pedro
 Church of São Tigao
 Church of the Misericórdia of Alandroal
 Church of the Misericórdia of Juromenha
 Church of the Misericórdia of Terena
 Hermitage of Nossa Senhora da Consolação
 Hermitage of Nossa Senhora da Vitória
 Hermitage of Nossa Senhora das Neves
 Hermitage of Santa Clara
 Hermitage of Santo Amaro
 Hermitage of Santo António
 Hermitage of São Bento
 Hermitage of São Pedro
 Hermitage of São Sebastião
 Hermitage/Shelter of Santa Marina
 Hospice/Hermitage of Nossa Senhora da Saúde
 Sanctuary of Nossa Senhora da Assunção da Boa Nova, the fortified Gothic sanctuary/church was founded in 1340 by D. Maria, wife of Alfonso XI Castilo and daughter of Afonso V of Portugal, after the victory at the Battle of Salado using a Greek cruciform plan. In 1700, it was remodelled by commander Luís Lencastre, followed later in the 18th century by the construction of two collateral altars, while maintaining the vaulted ceilings, itself painted in murals consisting of 20 rectangular images depicting the bible themes from the apocalypse of Saint John, and representations of the monarchs of the first dynasty;
 Way of the Cross

Culture
Popular and religious festivals in the municipality include the annual pilgrimage to the sanctuary of Nossa Senhora da Boa Nova in Terena, during the Easter Sunday; the fair of São Bento, on 15 April; and the fair in Juromenha, on 10 August.

Local artisans are also proficient in working with cork, nerium woods and schist stone.

Notable citizens
 Fernão Lopes (c. 1385 – after 1459) a Portuguese chronicler appointed by King Edward of Portugal
 Diogo Lopes de Sequeira (c. 1465 - c. 1530), was Portuguese fidalgo, Governor of India (1518–1522)

References

Notes

Sources

External links

Photos from ALANDROAL

 
Municipalities of Évora District